Hazorasp (Ҳазорасп), also known as Khazarasp, or by its more ancient name Hazarasp (meaning "thousand horses"), is an urban-type settlement in Uzbekistan, administrative centre of the Hazorasp District. Its population is 18,800 (2016). It lies at the head of the Amu Darya delta south of the Aral Sea.

It was an important trading center during the medieval period. During its history, the town has been subject to various battles; between the Ghaznavid Sultan Mahmud of Ghazni and the Ma'munid ruler Abu'l-Harith Muhammad in 1017; between the Seljuq Sultan Ahmad Sanjar and the Khwarazmian ruler Atsiz in 1147; and between the Khwarazmian ruler Muhammad II and the Ghurid ruler Mu'izz al-Din Muhammad. The town was finally destroyed during the Mongol invasions.

The town was later rebuilt, and only retained some of its importance. It was later a stronghold under the Mongol Arabshahids, and was also used as a residence by the Arabshahid princes. It was captured by the Russians during the Khivan campaign of 1873. The city has survived to present day, and is today a part of Uzbekistan. It was added to the UNESCO World Heritage Tentative List in January 2008, in the Cultural category

References

Sources 
 

Populated places in Xorazm Region
Urban-type settlements in Uzbekistan
World Heritage Sites in Uzbekistan
Historic sites in Uzbekistan
World Heritage Tentative List